The Portrait of a Man in a Wide-Brimmed Hat is a work by the Dutch Golden-Age artist Frans Hals. It was painted in about 1625–1635 and hangs in the Herzogliches Museum ("Ducal Museum"), part of the Friedenstein Palace complex at Gotha, Germany. It was stolen in 1979, recovered in 2019, and restored in 2020–2021.

Description and context
The work is a half-length portrait of a middle-class man who is about 30 years old. The sitter (who is not identified) has a rather glassy complexion and regular features. His nose is straight, his cheeks are rosy, and he wears a moustache. He is turned three-quarters right and smiles at the viewer. He holds his right hand to his breast and leans towards us a little to catch our attention. He seems to rest his right elbow on the picture-frame as if it were a window-sill, potentially crossing the boundary between his space and ours. The sitter wears a black doublet and a plain black silk cloak, a white falling collar of fine pleated linen, and a wide-brimmed black felt hat. The background is grey. From the viewer's perspective, the light falls from the left. The portrait is in oil on canvas glued to an oaken panel from later than 1688. It is not signed or dated. Cornelis Hofstede de Groot notes its "broad and vigorous" style, while Katja Kleinert (curator of 17th-century Dutch and Flemish art at the Gemäldegalerie, Berlin) observes that it makes a remarkably dynamic impression for a portrait from its time.

In the period when the portrait was painted, black attire was popular among male professionals, ecclesiastics, and magistrates in the Netherlands (where commerce, the sciences, and the arts were flourishing). A big black hat signalled masculinity and self-assuredness. Black was chic, evoking seriousness, religiosity, and restrained sobriety, and Hals was renowned for his masterly handling of black clothes. As Vincent van Gogh enthused 250 years later in a letter to his brother Theo: "Frans Hals heeft wel zeven en twintig zwarten" (Frans Hals must have twenty-seven blacks). The black cloak in particular is finished in the "rough" or "loose" style characteristic of Hals, seemingly dashed off at speed in broad, unblended brushstrokes. It lends his work vitality.

Like this sitter, some men wore a falling collar in the Netherlands in the late 1620s and early 1630s as an alternative to the physically and metaphorically stiff "millstone" ruff. Although high fashion at the time favoured an elaborate turned-back cuff to the shirt, this sitter's shirt has only modest lace trim at the wrist, of the kind typically worn by Mennonites.
  
Hofstede de Groot suggested the Portrait of a Man in a Wide-Brimmed Hat may be a self-portrait by Frans Hals, while Wilhelm Valentiner thought it possibly a pendant to the Portrait of a Seated Woman at Göteborg, Sweden (which is, however, now no longer attributed to Frans Hals).

In 1879, the director of paintings and engravings at Gotha, made a watercolour of the picture gallery at the Herzogliches Museum. It shows the Portrait of a Man in a Wide-Brimmed Hat as it was then hung (subject to a little artistic licence), near another Hals portrait that is now in a private collection.

Retribution, theft, return, and restoration
They included the Portrait of a Man in a Wide-Brimmed Hat, which was in storage at Reinhardsbrunn for safekeeping. The plan was to build a new museum in Moscow exhibiting art from the West. However, following a change of policy after the GDR had become established as an ally of the Soviet Union, the Portrait of a Man in a Wide-Brimmed Hat was returned to Gotha in 1958.

Twenty-one years later, the painting was stolen. In the early hours of 14 December 1979, one or more burglars broke into Friedenstein Palace and stole the Portrait of a Man in a Wide-Brimmed Hat as well as works by (or after) Ferdinand Bol, Jan Brueghel the Elder, Anthony van Dyck, and Hans Holbein the Elder in an evidently carefully planned and targeted operation. The police feared at the time that the paintings were damaged, because they found a trail of broken picture-frame parts along the escape route through the palace gardens. But despite extensive investigations by both the VoPo and the Stasi into what was the most significant art theft ever in the GDR, the trail went cold. In 2008, the mayor of Gotha, launched a media campaign in an effort to find and recover the stolen works, to no avail.

Then in June 2018, Kreuch was approached by a lawyer known to facilitate the return of stolen works of art. After long and sensitive negotiations conducted by Kreuch in person, the five pictures were given back "in fairly good shape" on 12 September 2019. Conservator Fuhyi Kuo restored the Portrait of a Man in a Wide-Brimmed Hat in Gotha, and the five returned works were exhibited together at the Herzogliches Museum in 2021–2022.

Attribution
Ernest II of Saxe-Gotha-Altenburg acquired the Portrait of a Man in a Wide-Brimmed Hat for the Gotha ducal collection in 1804. There it was at first attributed to Thomas de Keyser, but Schneider (1854), Ernst Wilhelm Moes (1909), Cornelis Hofstede de Groot (1910),  Wilhelm von Bode (1914), Wilhelm Valentiner (1923), Frans Dony (1976), and the Herzogliches Museum all attribute the painting to Frans Hals. Some other authorities, such as Seymour Slive, do not. In his 1974 catalogue, Slive lists the portrait but glosses its attribution to Frans Hals as ("D" for) doubtful – he had not had occasion to inspect the original work. In accord with Slive, Claus Grimm's 1989 catalogue omits the portrait from the works attributed to Frans Hals. 

When the painting was recovered in 2019, the Herzogliches Museum had it examined for authenticity at the Rathgen Research Laboratory in Berlin, which conducted infra-red reflectographic, radiographic, and macro analyses. Based on the report from the Rathgen and on Kleinert's opinion, the Herzogliches Museum concluded that the portrait is indeed the work of Frans Hals himself.

Date
Hofstede de Groot dates the portrait "about 1630–5". Valentiner has 1631–1633 but wonders whether it might not be a few years earlier. Kleinert has 1625–1630.

Illustrations for comparison

 

Wilhelm Valentiner thought the Portrait of a Seated Woman possibly a pendant to the Portrait of a Man in a Wide-Brimmed Hat, but it has since been disattributed. The woman wears a "millstone" ruff.

Isabella Coymans is a good example of Hals's "rough" or "loose" style of painting applied to black clothes.

Jan Miense Molenaar (the identity of the sitter is not certain) was painted by Frans Hals at about the same time as the similarly attired and posed Portrait of a Man in a Wide-Brimmed Hat. The face is handled similarly in the two portraits, as is the background. However, Molenaar wears big pleated cuffs, and his cloak is (deliberately) "slashed" to reveal the quality of his white shirt.

The other, later, portrait of a man with a hat by Frans Hals that once also hung at the Herzogliches Museum is now in a private collection. This sitter wears a glove, signalling his wealth.

References

Portraits by Frans Hals
Portraits of men
1620s paintings
1630s paintings